In algebra, an action of a monoidal category S on a category X is a functor

For example, S acts on itself via the monoid operation ⊗.

References 

Monoidal categories
Functors